Thomas Wilson (11 November 1764 – 17 June 1843) was a Congregational benefactor of chapels and educational institutions and founder member of the Council of University College London from 1825.

Thomas Wilson was a man of considerable wealth, his income being drawn from the manufacture of silk ribbon and from Remington family legacies (John Remington Mills was his nephew). As a prominent Victorian philanthropist, and a model to many, he promoted many causes, principally educational and theological.

Between 1794 and 1843, he was treasurer of Hoxton Academy and its successor Highbury College, Middlesex. From 1825 onwards he was a founder member of Council of University College London.

Wilson was an early director of the London Missionary Society, and in 1837 he became one of the founders of the Metropolitan Chapel Fund Association. Prior to this, he had already built at his own expense, several new Congregational chapels in London and elsewhere; the most famous being Claremont Chapel in Pentonville (1819) and Craven Chapel in Regent Street, Westminster (1822). Paddington Chapel in Westminster was another of Wilson's foundations, and here the congregation included Elizabeth Barrett Browning and Samuel Dyer.

Thomas Wilson's son and biographer, Joshua Wilson (1795–1874), was instrumental in proposals to form the Congregational Union of England and Wales. Letters addressed to Thomas Wilson's wife are preserved at Dr Williams's Library in London.

A memorial to Wilson stands in Abney Park Cemetery in Stoke Newington, London, in the Yew Walk.

References

Joshua Wilson, A Memoir of the Life and Character of Thomas Wilson esq, Treasurer of Highbury College, John Snow, Lond. 1846

English Congregationalists
1764 births
1843 deaths
Wilson, Thomas (philanthropist)